

Hauptscharführer was a Nazi paramilitary rank which was used by the Schutzstaffel (SS) between the years of 1934 and 1945.  The rank was the highest enlisted rank of the SS, with the exception of the special Waffen-SS rank of Sturmscharführer.

The Hauptscharführer became a SS rank after a reorganization of the SS following the Night of the Long Knives.  The first use of Hauptscharführer was in June 1934 when the rank replaced the older SA title of Obertruppführer.

Within the Allgemeine-SS (general-SS), a Hauptscharführer was typically the head SS-non-commissioned officer of an SS-Sturm (company) or was a rank used by enlisted staff personnel assigned to an SS headquarters office or security agency (such as the Gestapo and Sicherheitsdienst (SD)).

The rank of Hauptscharführer was also commonly used in the concentration camp service and could also be found as a rank of the Einsatzgruppen.  The rank of SS-Hauptscharführer was senior to SS-Oberscharführer and junior to SS-Sturmscharführer, except in the General-SS where Hauptscharführer was immediately junior to rank of SS-Untersturmführer.

In the Waffen-SS, Hauptscharführer was a rank bestowed upon company and battalion non-commissioned officers and was considered the second highest enlisted rank, below that of Sturmscharführer. Those holding the Waffen-SS rank of Hauptscharführer were typically also granted the title of Stabsscharführer, which was an appointment held by the senior SS non-commissioned officer of a company, battalion, or regiment.

The insignia for Hauptscharführer was two silver pips, with a silver stripe centred on a black collar patch. On field grey uniforms, the rank was worn with silver collar piping and the Wehrmacht shoulder boards of an Oberfeldwebel.

Insignia

See also
 Table of ranks and insignia of the Waffen-SS

Notes

Bibliography 

 
 
 

SS ranks